Fangchanupathum School (Thai: โรงเรียนฝางชนูปถัมภ์) is a public school in Fang District, Chiang Mai Province, Thailand.

History
Fangchanupathum School was approved by the Department of General Education and began secondary level teaching in 1961. The school is in Ban Song Kwae, 7 km from Fang. People from tambon San Sai and Mae Sun built a one-storey building. The first class had 34 students and three teachers. Mr. Damrong Wiwatnaphon was the first principal in 1966.

School system

Mathayom Ton
At Mathayom Ton levels (grades 7–9), students follow eight core subjects each semester: Thai language, mathematics, science, social science, health and physical education, arts and music, technology, and foreign languages.

Mathayom Pai
At Mathayom Pai levels (grades 10–12), students are allowed to choose one or two elective courses. The science programme (Wit-Kanit) and the mathematics-English language programme (Sil-Kamnuan) are among the most popular. Foreign language programmes (Sil-Phasa) include (Chinese and English).

Departments
 Course Development
 Register
 Learning Skills
 Library
 Quality inspection
 Guidance

Learning skills
 Thai language
 Foreign language
 Social studies
 Mathematics
 Sciences
 Health
 Occupations and Technology
 Arts

References

Schools in Thailand
Chiang Mai province
Educational institutions established in 1961
1961 establishments in Thailand